C. K. Yang may refer to:

 C. K. Yang (sociologist) (Ch'ing-k'un Yang), Chinese-American sociologist
 Yang Chuan-kwang, Taiwanese decathlete